NGC 517, also occasionally referred to as PGC 5214 or UGC 960, is a lenticular galaxy located approximately 188 million light-years from the Solar System in the constellation Pisces. It was discovered on 13 September 1784 by astronomer William Herschel.

Observation history 
Herschel discovered the object along with NGC 515 using Beta Andromedae as a reference star. He described his discovery as "two, both stellar", indicating his misidentification of the object as a star. While Herschel only noted one position about 35" east of NGC 515, Heinrich d'Arrest made the first accurate measurement of the object, using observation data of three separate nights. The object was also observed by John Herschel, son of William Herschel and later catalogued by John Louis Emil Dreyer in the New General Catalogue, where the galaxy was described as "pretty faint, round, stellar, southeastern of 2" with the other one being NGC 515.

Description 
The galaxy has an apparent visual magnitude of 12.5 and can be classified as type S0 using the Hubble Sequence. The object's distance of roughly 190 million light-years from the Solar System can be estimated using its redshift and Hubble's law.

See also 
 Lenticular galaxy 
 List of NGC objects (1–1000)
 Pisces (constellation)

References

External links 

 
 SEDS

Lenticular galaxies
Pisces (constellation)
0517
5214
00960
Astronomical objects discovered in 1784
Discoveries by William Herschel